John Joseph "Johnny" Palermo (March 1, 1982 — June 8, 2009) was an American television actor.

Early life
A native of Rochester, New York, Palermo graduated from Webster High School in 2000.  He is the son of John M. Palermo and Patricia A. Crawford and brother to Jennifer M. Alma and Rick F. Palermo. While there, he played football and was a member of the school's state championship team in 1999. Johnny also loved to make movies as a kid using his father's camera and anyone and anything he could find to star in his feature films. Palermo later attended the Art Institute of Pittsburgh, where he studied special-effects movie makeup.

Career
In 2002, Palermo moved to Los Angeles to pursue his acting career. He subsequently appeared in more than 30 television shows. He was a regular on the Nickelodeon series Just for Kicks, and he had appeared in Everybody Hates Chris as Chris' overgrown classmate Frank DiPaolo.

Death
On June 8, 2009, he and his girlfriend Alessandra Giangrande were both killed in an early morning car crash in North Hollywood, California.  Giangrande was driving at the time. Palermo was 27 years old at the time of his death.

Filmography 
 Cold Case (2004, TV Series) as Ken Mazzacone (1978)
 Days of Our Lives (2005, TV Series) as Marine Medic 
 Passions (2005, TV Series) as Jon #2
 General Hospital (2005-2007, TV Series) as Vinnie / Bus Boy
 Sissy Frenchfry (2005, Short) as Ross
 Without a Trace (2005, TV Series) as Uniformed Cop
 Sad Potato (2005)
 Campus Ladies (2006, TV Series) as T-Man - Frat Guy
 Slip (2006) - Gumbo
 Just for Kicks (2006, TV Series) as Evan Ribisi
 What About Brian (2006, TV Series) as Vendor #2
 Everybody Hates Chris (2006, TV Series) as Frank DiPaolo
 ER (2007, TV Series) as Officer Scanaloni
 CSI: NY (2008, TV Series) as Ronnie Hall
 How I Met Your Mother (2008, TV Series) as Cafe Guy
 CSI: Miami (2009, TV Series) as Louie Clayton
 Rules of Engagement (2009, TV Series) as Rocco
 Angel of Death (2009) as Leroy
 Pizza with Bullets (2009) as Young Don Vito (final film role)

References

External links 

1982 births
2009 deaths
Male actors from New York (state)
American male television actors
Road incident deaths in California
21st-century American male actors
20th-century American male actors